Lieutenant-General Thomas Henry Pakenham  (26 June 1826 – 20 February 1913) was an Irish Conservative politician and British Army officer.

Military career
A member of the Pakenham family headed by the Earl of Longford, he was the son of the Honourable Sir Hercules Pakenham and the Honourable Emily Stapleton, daughter of Thomas Stapleton, 16th Baron le Despencer. He fought in the Crimean War in 1854 and in the Fenian raids in 1866. He was first elected as the Member of Parliament (MP) for Antrim in 1854, succeeding his brother Edward Pakenham, who was killed at the Battle of Inkerman. He remained MP until 1865. He became Commander of 1st Infantry Brigade in February 1878 and General Officer Commanding Western District in 1880.

Pakenham married Elizabeth Staples Clarke, daughter of William Clarke, of New York City, in 1862. They had two sons, Hercules Pakenham and Major Harry Francis Pakenham. Pakenham died in February 1913, aged 86. His wife died in February 1919.

References

External links 

|-

1826 births
1913 deaths
Members of the Parliament of the United Kingdom for County Antrim constituencies (1801–1922)
UK MPs 1852–1857
UK MPs 1857–1859
UK MPs 1859–1865
British Army lieutenant generals
Military personnel from Dublin (city)
Thomas
Companions of the Order of the Bath
Irish Conservative Party MPs